OpenMusic (OM) is an object-oriented visual programming environment for musical composition based on Common Lisp.
It may also be used as an all-purpose visual interface to Lisp programming. At a more specialized level, a set of provided classes and libraries make it a very convenient environment for music composition.

History
OpenMusic is the last in a series of computer-assisted composition software designed at IRCAM.
Versions of OpenMusic are currently available for Mac OS X (PowerPC and Intel), Windows and Linux. The source code has been released under the GNU Lesser General Public License (LGPL).

Programming in OpenMusic
Programs in OpenMusic are created by connecting together (a process known as 'patching') either pre-defined or user-defined modules, in a similar manner to graphical signal-processing environments such as Max/MSP or Pd. Unlike such environments, however, the result of an OpenMusic computation will typically be displayed in conventional music notation, which can then be directly manipulated, if so required, via an editor. A substantial body of specialized libraries has been contributed by users, which extends OpenMusic's functionality into such areas as constraint programming, aleatoric composition, spectral music, minimalist music, music theory,  fractals, music information retrieval, sound synthesis etc.

Composers using OpenMusic 
Alain Bancquart
Brian Ferneyhough
Joshua Fineberg
Karim Haddad
Rozalie Hirs
Eres Holz
Michael Jarrell
Fabien Lévy
Magnus Lindberg
Fang Man
Philippe Manoury
Tristan Murail
Kaija Saariaho
Marco Stroppa

References

 OpenMusic : Un langage visuel pour la composition musicale assistée par ordinateur, Carlos Agon, PhD Thesis, IRCAM—Univ. Paris 6.
 The OM Composer's Book 1, ed. Carlos Agon, Gérard Assayag and Jean Bresson, 2006, Editions Delatour/IRCAM; .
 The OM Composer's Book 2, ed. Jean Bresson, Carlos Agon and Gérard Assayag, 2008, Editions Delatour/IRCAM.
 The OM Composer's Book 3, ed. Jean Bresson, Carlos Agon and Gérard Assayag, 2016, Editions Delatour/IRCAM.
 Fabio Selvafiorita's Thesis in Italian, Selvafiorita, Fabio, .
 Composition assistée par ordinateur : techniques et outils de programmation visuelle pour la création musicale, Jean Bresson, Université Pierre et Marie Curie, 2017.

External links 
OpenMusic Homepage, with full OM class and function reference, tutorials and instructions on building OM from source.

Audio programming languages
Common Lisp (programming language) software
Visual programming languages